Conrad Olson may refer to:
 Conrad P. Olson (1882–1952), American politician and judge in Oregon
 Conrad Olson (Minnesota politician) (1895–1953), member of the Minnesota Senate